Joseph Mpande (born 12 March 1994) is a Ugandan professional footballer who plays in Vietnam as a forward for Hải Phòng in V.League 1.

International career
In January 2014, coach Milutin Sedrojevic, invited him to be included in the Uganda national football team for the 2014 African Nations Championship. The team placed third in the group stage of the competition after beating Burkina Faso, drawing with Zimbabwe and losing to Morocco.

After leaving Myanmar League, he moved to Vietnam and play for Hai Phong.

Honours

Individual
2018 Myanmar National League: Top Scorer (18 goals)

References

External links
 

Living people
Uganda A' international footballers
2014 African Nations Championship players
Association football forwards
Ugandan footballers
1993 births
Uganda international footballers
Sportspeople from Kampala
Ugandan expatriate sportspeople in Vietnam
Ugandan expatriate sportspeople in Myanmar
Expatriate footballers in Vietnam
Expatriate footballers in Myanmar
Ugandan expatriate footballers